Cilostamide is a PDE3 inhibitor.

References

Phosphodiesterase inhibitors
2-Quinolone ethers at the benzene ring
Butyramides